The Samakhiali–Maliya Miyana section belongs to Western Railway of Ahmedabad Division.

Line
This line connects Samakhiali and Maliya Miyana. Further from Maliya Miyana, It divides into two sections Maliya Miyana–Viramgam section and Maliya Miyana–Wankaner section. About five express trains pass through this line daily. This is an important line for freight service to Kandla Port and Mundra Port. Later in October 2011, a goods train with 120 wagons plied on this section.

References

5 ft 6 in gauge railways in India
Railway lines in Gujarat

1969 establishments in Gujarat